The following is a list of the exports of Brazil. Data is for 2012, in billions of United States dollars, as reported by The Observatory of Economic Complexity. Currently the top twenty exports are listed.

References
 atlas.media.mit.edu - Observatory of Economic complexity - Products exported by Brazil (2012)

Brazil
Exports
Foreign trade of Brazil